Thagora was a Carthaginian and Roman town at what is now Taoura, Algeria.

Name

The Tabula Peutingeriana calls it Thacora.

History
Thagora was an inland trading post controlled by Carthage. It minted bronze coins with a bearded head obverse and a prancing horse beneath a star reverse.

Under the Romans, it formed part of the province of Numidia.

Religion 
Thagora was a Christian bishopric. The names of three of its diocesan bishops are known. It fell into abeyance following the Islamic conquest of the Maghreb but was revived by the Roman Catholic Church as a titular see.

List of bishops
Xanthippus, mentioned by Augustine of Hippo in 401
Postumianus, who participated in the Conference of Carthage (411)
Timotheus, twentieth in the list of the Catholic bishops whom Hunneric summoned to Carthage in 484 and then exiled.
John Baptist Cahill (1900)
Alexandre Piquemal (1909–1920)
Miguel de los Santos Díaz y Gómara (1920–1924)
Jozef Cársky (1925–1962)
Carlo Livraghi (1962–1975)
Eduardo Martínez Somalo (1975–1988)
Cipriano Calderón Polo (1988–2009)
Giuseppe Marciante (2009–)
Koen Vanhoutte (2018-)

References

Citations

Bibliography

 .

Phoenician colonies in Algeria
Catholic titular sees in Africa